The Honeywell AGT1500 is a gas turbine engine. It is the main powerplant of the M1 Abrams series of tanks. The engine was originally designed and produced by the Lycoming Turbine Engine Division in the Stratford Army Engine Plant. In 1995, production was moved to the Anniston Army Depot in Anniston, Alabama, after the Stratford Army Engine Plant was shut down.

Specifications

The engine can use a variety of fuels, including jet fuel, gasoline, diesel and marine diesel.

The engine is a three-shaft machine composed of five sub-modules:
 Recuperator – a fixed cylindrical regenerative heat exchanger that extracts waste heat from the exhaust gases and uses it to preheat the compressed air
 Rotating Gas Producer – the five-stage, dual-spool compressor which achieves a 14.5:1 compression ratio at full power, driven by the compressor turbine, which operates with a maximum turbine inlet temperature of 
 Accessory Gearbox – bevel gears that extract  from the high-pressure spool to operate the fuel control unit, starter, oil pump, and vehicle hydraulic pump
 Power Turbines – the first stage of the two-stage power turbine is driven by a variable-geometry nozzle to improve efficiency
 Reduction Gearbox – reduces power turboshaft speed

History
Development had started by 1964 with a contract given to Chrysler in 1976, originally as an engine for the later cancelled MBT-70.

In the early 1970s, the AGT1500 was developed into the PLT27, a flight-weight turboshaft for use in helicopters. This engine lost to the General Electric GE12 (T700) in three separate competitions to power the UH-60, AH-64, and SH-60. Serial production of the AGT1500 began in 1980; by 1992, more than 11,000 engines had been delivered. In 1986, with the Cold War about to wind down, Textron Lycoming began developing a commercial marine derivative, which they called the TF15.

See also
 Anselm Franz, lead designer of AGT1500 at the early stage

References

External links

 AGT1500 Gas Turbine Engine
 AGT1500 Turbine Technology pdf on Honeywell.com
 

Gas turbines
Tank engines
Honeywell Aerospace aircraft engines